George Stilman Hill (April 10, 1794 – April 13, 1858) was a lawyer and political figure in New Brunswick. He represented Charlotte in the Legislative Assembly of New Brunswick from 1831 to 1846.

Born in Milltown, New Brunswick, the son of Abner Hill, an American-born emigrant to New Brunswick, and Mary Whitney, he was educated at Dartmouth College in New England and went on to study law with Ward Chipman. Hill practised law in St. Stephen. He married Sarah Upton. Hill was named to the Legislative Council of New Brunswick in 1850. He died in office in Fredericton.

His former home is now designated as a local historic place in St. Stephen.

References 

1794 births
1858 deaths
Members of the Legislative Assembly of New Brunswick
Members of the Legislative Council of New Brunswick
People from St. Stephen, New Brunswick
Colony of New Brunswick people